Tutto Fabrizio De André is the first full-length release by Fabrizio De André and his first release credited with his full name (in earlier releases, he was credited as just "Fabrizio"). It is also his last release on Karim label.
It was released in 1966 as an anthology of his previous single releases from 1963 on. 
His very first songs, "Nuvole barocche" and "E fu la notte", which De André regarded only as "youth sins" and didn't consider part of his own discography, were not included in the album.

Track listing

La canzone di Marinella
The album was re-released in 1968, on Roman Record Company label (Catalog: RCP 703), with a different artwork, under the title La canzone di Marinella. The title choice was due to the success met by the song when it was brought to the general public by singer Mina, who had recorded a cover of it in the previous year.

Personnel
Fabrizio De André – acoustic guitar, vocals
Vittorio Centanaro – lead guitar
Pinuccio Pierazzoli – bass
Franco De Gemini - harmonica

1966 debut albums
Fabrizio De André albums
Italian-language albums
Karim (record label) albums